Life of Villa is a 1912 silent war documentary set during the Mexican Revolution. Though some scenes are re-enacted after it happened, the movie is a real documentary on the struggle of Mexican revolutionary Pancho Villa to overthrow dictator Porfirio Díaz.

Cast
 Pancho Villa       as  himself
 Luis Terrazas  as  himself

External links 
 

1912 films
Documentary films about revolutionaries
Documentary films about Mexico
Films about Pancho Villa
American silent films
American black-and-white films
American documentary films
1912 documentary films
1910s American films